Ivan Alekseyevich Kablukov (2 September 1857 – 5 May 1942) was a Russian and Soviet physical chemist. He helped develop ideas on ions, electrochemistry, and conductivity. He published influential textbooks on organic chemistry and was a professor at Moscow State University at the Timiryazev Agricultural Academy. 

Kablukov was born in Prussy, Moscow, where his father Alexei Fedorovich Kablukov was a physician. Both his father and his mother, Ekaterina S. Storozhevaya, came from peasant families. His mother encouraged him in science and they had a small collection of books at home. He studied at the 2nd classical gymnasium in Moscow before going to study natural sciences at the University of Moscow under Vladimir Markovnikov. His first work was on alcohols and their derivatives based on Alexander Butlerov's ideas on organic chemistry. Graduating in 1880 he then received a grant and was sent to St. Petersburg University where he attended Dmitri Mendeleev's lectures, read Nikolai Menshutkin's work and received a master's degree in 1882. Under the advice of Butlerov, he synthesized formaldehyde from methyl alcohol using platinized asbestos. He became an honorary laboratory assistant to I.I. Kanonnikov in 1884 and started teaching the next year at several school to receive sufficient income. He was nominated assistant professor at the Moscow State University in 1899 and began to teach there as well as at the Timiryazev Agricultural Academy.

Kablukov studied electrolysis and the conductivity of solvents and noted that hydrochloric acid solutions in low concentrations would suddenly or anomalously show lowered conductivity. His doctoral dissertation was on the theory of solutions (1891) in which he came up with the idea that ions in solution were responsible for electrical conductivity and that solvents formed weak bonds with the ions. Kablukov formulated the idea that "When organic oxides combine with hydrohalic acids, the haloid joins the most hydrogenized atom of carbon, while the hydroxide forms a bond with the least hydrogenized one." He also identified differences in the heat of formation of organic isomers. Kablukov also took an interest in the chemical composition of honey and beeswax, thanks to Butlerov's interest in bees. In 1902 he published a study of the composition of honey and the detection of its adulteration. He published textbooks on Physical Chemistry (1900), Electrochemistry (1902), and Thermochemistry (1910). His students included Nikolay Demyanov, Avenir Yakovkin, Vladimir Aleksandrovich Plotnikov (1873-1947), and V.I. Spitsyn.

References

External links 

 History of Electrochemistry in Russia

1857 births
1942 deaths
Corresponding Members of the USSR Academy of Sciences
Honorary Members of the USSR Academy of Sciences
Moscow State University alumni
Academic staff of Moscow State University
Professors of the Moscow State University
Recipients of the Order of Lenin
Recipients of the Order of the Red Banner of Labour
Russian physical chemists
Soviet physical chemists